Some dishes are shared by the two Koreas; however, availability and quality of Northern cuisine is much more significantly affected by sociopolitical class divides.

Historically, Korean cuisine has evolved through centuries of social and political change. Originating from ancient agricultural and nomadic traditions in southern Manchuria and the Korean Peninsula, it has gone through a complex interaction of the natural environment and different cultural trends. Rice dishes and kimchi are staple Korean foods. In a traditional meal, they accompany both side dishes (panch'an) and main courses like chuk (porridge), pulgogi (grilled meat) or myŏn (noodles). Soju liquor is the best-known traditional Korean spirit.

North Korean cuisine

Some North Korean dishes and foods are also prepared in South Korea, and many dishes that originated in North Korea were brought to South Korea by migrating families after the Korean War. Many of these imported dishes became staples in the South Korean diet.

In North Korea, some dishes vary in flavor compared to South Korean versions, with some North Korean dishes being less spicy and more varied in composition compared to South Korean preparations. North Korean dishes have been described as having a specific tanginess that is derived from using ingredients with flavors of sweet, sour, pungent and spicy, in combinations that create this effect.

Some restaurants, particularly in Pyongyang, have expensive pricing relative to average worker wages in North Korea. Accessibility to restaurants is not always available to average North Korean citizens, with tourists and rich citizens being the primary patrons at some of them, particularly upscale ones. Per their pricing, upscale restaurants are typically available only to well-paid leaders of the North Korean government, tourists visiting the country, and the emerging affluent middle class of donju in the country. Donju means "masters of money", and the donju typically hold positions in the government, positions operating state-owned businesses outside of the country, and positions involving bringing investments and the importation of products into the country.

Some street foods exist in North Korea, such as in Pyongyang, where vendors operate food stalls. North Korea's first pizzeria opened in 2009. Alcoholic beverages are produced and consumed in North Korea, and the country's legal drinking age is 18.

North Korean dishes and foods

 Barley
 Beef rib soup
 Bellflower
 Chapch'ae
 Chicken
 Chinese cabbage stew
 Chokbal – consists of pig's trotters cooked with soy sauce and various spices. Additional ingredients can include onion, leeks, garlic, cinnamon and black pepper.
 Cookies
 Corn – it is not uncommon for North Koreans to grind corn, often including the corn cobs and husks to extend the mixture
 Edible mushrooms – such as wild pine mushrooms

 Herbs and greens – used as an ingredient and in salads
 Hot pot

Kajami shik'ae – a fermented and salted food prepared in North Korea using flounder and additional ingredients such as quinoa, garlic, ginger and chili flakes.
 Kimbap
 Kimchi – very common in North Korea, it is consumed as both a condiment and as a side dish, and often accompanies every meal. Kimchi is relied upon by North Koreans during the winter months when fresh vegetables are unavailable.
Kkaktuki – diced radish kimchi
 Kogi bap – a rice dish with artificial meat, it is a popular North Korean street food
 Injo kogi – sausages prepared using soybeans and other ingredients.
 Injo kogi bap - cooked rice wrapped in a skin of leftover soybean paste.
 Korean chestnut
 Mandu – various dumplings, mandu styles vary in different regions of North Korea
 P'yŏnsu – square-shaped mandu popular in Kaesong
 Meats – meat consumption tends to be rare in North Korea, and most citizens only have access to meats during the public holidays of the birthdays of Kim Il-sung and Kim Jong-il, when extra meat is included in government rations provided to North Koreans. Meats that are consumed include mostly pork, rabbit and occasionally goat. Beef consumption is essentially not allowed in North Korea, but very limited consumption of small amounts of beef is permitted, which is sometimes used in stews or soups.
 Millet
 Miyŏk-kuk – a nutritious vegetable soup prepared with seaweed

 Noodles and noodle dishes – in North Korean culture, long noodles represent a long life or a long marriage, and long noodles are served to people at weddings.
 Beef noodle soup
 Corn noodles
 Raengmyŏn – referred to as "naengmyeon" in South Korea, it is a traditional Korean cold noodle dish that is prepared using buckwheat noodles in North Korea. In North Korea, additional ingredients in the dish typically include some slices of meat, dried egg and hot sauce. The noodles are prepared using the flour and starch from ingredients such as buckwheat, potatoes and sweet potatoes. Some variations of the dish in North Korea is to include raw fish, cucumber, radish and Asian pear. Some North Koreans state that raengmyŏn originated in North Korea, and that it was introduced to South Korea by North Koreans who emigrated to South Korea after the Korean War occurred.
 Ramyŏn – referred to as "curly noodles" in North Korea. Shin Ramyun is a brand of instant noodles produced in South Korea that is nicknamed "money ramen" in North Korea, due to its relatively expensive pricing in North Korea at around 800 won per unit. In 2009, boxes of Shin Ramyun that contain twenty packages of ramen per box costed around 30,000 North Korean won, which in North Korea is expensive, and therefore not available to most North Korean citizens at this price.
 Rice noodles

 P'ajǒn
 Panch'an – side dishes that accompany full meals, panch'an dishes are typically spicy, salty or tangy, and many are fermented, which adds flavor. Restaurants in North Korea typically charge for these accompaniments
 Pheasant
 Pibimpap – white rice with vegetables and other ingredients
Tolsot pibimpap – hot stone pot pibimpap
 Pickled cucumber
 Pindae-ttŏk – a fried green bean pancake prepared using mung beans, green onion and kimchi. Pindae-ttŏk first appears under the name binjatteok in the Umsik timipang, a cooking encyclopedia written in the 1670s by Chang Kye-hyang, the wife of a public officer.
 Porridge – a staple food in North Korea
 Potatoes and potato dishes. See also: potato production in North Korea.
 Pulgogi – marinated and grilled beef
 Quail eggs and quail egg jelly
 Rice – short-grain rice is a staple food in North Korea. 
 Rice cakes
 Seafood – seafood dishes and raw seafood are a part of the cuisine, and seafood is a staple food in North Korea
Alaska pollock
 Clams
 Cod
 Kimbap sushi
 Gray mullet fish soup
 Octopus
 Salmon and raw salmon
 Seaweed
 Shinsŏllo

 Snack foods – examples of snack foods produced within North Korea include kangjǒng, cookies, puffy snacks and cotton candy pieces.
 Sundae – traditional Korean sausages that are a popular street food
 Sungŏ-kuk
 Tangogikuk – traditional soup with dog meat as a primary ingredient
 Tofu – a staple food in North Korea
 Tofu bap – a tofu and rice dish that is a common street food in North Korea.
 Tot'ori-muk – acorn jelly
 Ttŏk – sticky rice cakes, sometimes with fillings
 Turkey
 Yakpap – a traditional sweet dish prepared using steamed glutinous rice, chestnuts, dates, honey and other ingredients

Condiments

Some condiments used in North Korea to add flavor to foods are listed below.
 Bean paste
 Garlic
 Ginger
 Koch'ujang – prepared as a sauce and as a red pepper paste
 Pepper flakes
 Sesame oil
 Soy sauce

Beverages

 Bottled water is imported from China, and is typically consumed by the donju, "the new affluent middle class" in North Korea. "Shindŏk' Saemmul" is a spring water produced in North Korea, but it is exported to countries in Southeast Asia, and is typically not available in the North Korean market.
 Coffee
 Instant coffee – some instant coffee in North Korea is produced within the country
 Ginseng tea – a common beverage in North Korea
 Soft drinks – soft drink bottlers exist in North Korea, such as the Wonbong Trading Co. in Pyongyang. Soft drink products produced within North Korea are sometimes labeled as "carbonated sweet water". Sometime in 2017, Air Koryo, North Korea's flagship airline, began offering its own brand of soft drinks on flights to and from Beijing, China. Air Koryo soft drinks are also purveyed at some North Korean grocery stores. Coca-Cola bottled in China is available in upscale grocery stores in Pyongyang, and Pepsi bottled in China is also available, although it is rare compared to Coca-Cola's availability.
 Ryongjin Cocoa - a North Korean own brand cola made and canned in the country
 Taech'u-ch'a – a traditional Korean tea prepared with jujube and a pine nut garnish

Alcoholic beverages

Alcoholic beverages are consumed in North Korea, and drinking is a part of the culture of North Korea. North Korea's legal drinking age is 18, but minors are sometimes allowed to consume alcoholic beverages, and some shop keepers readily sell them alcoholic drinks. Some North Koreans brew and distill alcoholic beverages at home, despite such home alcohol production being forbidden in North Korea, and some sell these beverages to markets, although this is also illegal. Home brewed liquor is made using ingredients such as potatoes and corn. Some North Korean consumers purchase alcoholic beverages directly from alcohol-producing factories in the country, using cash. In recent times, imported Chinese liquor has been allowed to be sold in markets, and a well-known Chinese liquor purveyed in North Korea is Kaoliang Liquor, which has a 46-50% alcohol content.

North Korea has some bars and other drinking establishments, and in recent times, beer halls have become popular in Pyongyang.

 Beer is produced in North Korea, and craft beer production has increased in recent times. The major breweries in the country are Taedonggang Brewing Company, Paradise Microbrewery and the Yanggakdo Hotel Microbrewery. In August 2016, the Taedonggang Brewing Company held the country's first beer festival, which included several Taedonggang varieties and other local beers. Local beers at the festival included rice beer and dark beers.
Beer brands produced in North Korea
 Pohak
 Ponghak 
 Pyongyang
 Rakwon ("Paradise")
 Ryongsong
 Samgak ("Delta")
 Taedonggang – brewed by the state-owned Taedonggang Brewing Company based in Pyongyang In 2017, Taedonggang was the most popular beer in North Korea.
 Makkŏlli – a specialty rice wine with a milky appearance, it is common in the countryside of North Korea Makgeolli is produced using the same process used for the production of soju, and typically has a lower alcohol content compared to soju. It is considered by some to be inferior compared to soju.
 Rice liquor – rice-based liquor is consumed by more North Koreans compared to beer.
 Rice wine – glutinous rice wine is a specialty alcoholic beverage in North Korea
 Soju – referred to as nongtaegi in North Korea, soju is a clear specialty spirit prepared from sweet potato or barley in North Korea. It is similar to sake. In North Korea, soju's alcohol content ranges from 18 to 25 percent.
 Whisky - in 2019 North Korea created its first batch of homemade whisky. Samilpo Whisky has been designed to resemble Johnnie Walker to aid brand recognition for North Koreans

See also

 Korean cuisine
 Korean regional cuisine
 Pyongyang#Cuisine
 List of Korean dishes
 List of Korean desserts
 List of Korean drinks
 North Korean famine

Notes

References

Further reading

External links
 "Table the Politics and Bite Into North Korean Cuisine at 'Pyongyang Okryu'". Khaosod English. December 11, 2015.
 
 
 
 
 

 
Korean cuisine-related lists

fr:Culture de la Corée du Nord#Cuisine(s)